B-17 Flying Fortress: The Mighty 8th is a combat flight simulator developed by Wayward Design and published by Hasbro Interactive under the MicroProse brand in 2000 as a sequel to the 1992 flight simulator B-17 Flying Fortress World War II Bombers in Action. Tommo purchased the rights to this game and digitally publishes it through its Retroism brand in 2015.

Reception

Samuel Bass reviewed the PC version of the game for Next Generation, rating it one star out of five.

The game received "favorable" reviews according to the review aggregation website Metacritic.

References

External links
 

2000 video games
MicroProse games
Single-player video games
Tommo games
Video games developed in the United Kingdom
Windows games
Windows-only games
World War II flight simulation video games